Free and Open Indo-Pacific (FOIP) is an umbrella term that encompasses Indo-Pacific-specific strategies of countries with similar interests in the region. The concept, with its origins in Weimar German geopolitics, has been revived since 2006 through Japanese initiatives and American cooperation since 2006. 

Japan introduced the FOIP concept and formally put it down as a strategy in 2016. In 2019 the United States Department of State published a document formalizing its concept of a free and open Indo-Pacific. Since then, multiple countries from the European Union to Southeast Asia, have referred to the Indo-Pacific in national security or foreign policy documents.

Origin 

Historians and political scientists have shown that the "Indo-Pacific" emerged in the contexts of Weimar German geopolitics in the 1920s-1930s, and has since spread to Japan through Karl Haushofer's intervention.

During 2006–07 when Taro Aso was Foreign Minister, Japan presented the idea of "Freedom and Prosperity".

In August 2007, Prime Minister Shinzo Abe's speech in the Parliament of India included the scope of thinking as followings:

According to the Japanese Ministry of Foreign Affairs (MOFA), Abe first officially explained Japan's commitment to the FOIP strategy in Kenya on 27 August 2016.

However, even before this, the concept of FOIP also falls in place with Abe's thinking of "diplomacy that takes a panoramic perspective of the world map". In 2012, Prime Minister Abe's first elucidation of FOIP went as follows:

Indo-Pacific-specific strategies

Japan's diplomatic implementation 
In January 2013, Japanese government had prepared a PM Abe's speech on "Five New Principles" to be delivered in Jakarta. However, as PM Abe had to go back to Japan before the scheduled date to respond to In Amenas hostage crisis, the speech was not realized, instead its script was made available.

In 2015, to implement the framework, Japan upgraded "The Guidelines for Japan-U.S. Defense Cooperation" with US, agreed and shared "Japan and India Vision 2025 Special Strategic and Global Partnership" with India, agreed and shared "Next steps of the Special Strategic Partnership: Asia, Pacific and Beyond" with Australia, and the quadrilateral framework was prepared.

India's foreign policy 
The Indian government stands for a free, open and rules-based Indo-Pacific as it is important for economic development of the region and the wider global community. A central feature of Indian Prime Minister Narendra Modi’s foreign policy has been to advance the need to create a “free, open, and inclusive” Indo-Pacific.

The U.S. National Security Strategy 
In the 2017 US National Security Strategy, Asia-Pacific was exchanged with Indo-Pacific. On 30 May 2018, The United States Pacific Command (USPACOM) is also renamed the United States Indo-Pacific Command (USINDOPACOM).

In December 2021, Secretary of State Antony Blinken delivered a speech on the United States' approach to the Indo-Pacific in Jakarta.

In February 2022, Biden-⁠Harris Administration published "Indo-Pacific Strategy of the United States" which describes "free and open" as top priority.
In the 2022 Biden-⁠Harris Administration's National Security Strategy, "Promote a Free and Open Indo-Pacific" is described at the top of its part four; our strategy by region.

Australia's foreign policy 
In 2017 Foreign Policy White Paper, stable and prosperous Indo–Pacific is described as the most important Australia's interest, and Indo–Pacific democracies are described as of first order importance to Australia.

ASEAN 
In June 2019, the ASEAN released an Indo-Pacific related document which reiterates and furthers pre-existing mechanisms.

NATO 
, NATO does not have a policy for the Indo Pacific, yet its political and diplomatic interests in the region are broad. Apart from the U.S., more recently other NATO countries have reoriented their maritime policy in defense of a Free and Open Indo-Pacific (FOIP).

Europe 
In September 2021, the European Union published Joint Communication on the EU's Indo-Pacific Strategy.

France

France is an Indo-Pacific power because of the several territories of France located there. 
released a strategy in 2019 which was subsequently updated in 2021.

Germany
Germany adopted policy guidelines for the region in September 2020.

Netherlands
In November 2020, Netherlands published "Indo-Pacific: Guidelines for strengthening Dutch and EU cooperation with partners in Asia".

Canada's Indo-Pacific Strategy 
In November 2022, Canada launched Indo-Pacific Strategy to support long-term growth, prosperity, and security for Canadians.

South Korea's diplomatic strategy 
South Korea's approach to the Indo-Pacific is based on cooperation and complementarity between its New Southern Policy and the U.S.'s and the Quad's Indo-Pacific policy, but without openly antagonizing China.
In this respect, South Korea is balancing the desire for foreign policy autonomy with the need for strategic alliances, above all with the United States.

In December 2022, South Korea published "Strategy for a Free, Peaceful, and Prosperous Indo-Pacific Region".

Criticism 
Political scientist Sharifah Munirah Alatas has argued that the origin of the term "Indo-Pacific" was Euro-centric, so it lacked the input of Asian countries in a broader anticolonial context. The Australian Citizens Party has publicly denounced the "Nazi roots" of the "Indo-Pacific" concept.

See also 
 AUKUS
 Indo-Pacific
 Indo-Pacific Economic Framework (IPEF)
 Quadrilateral Security Dialogue (Quad)
 List of islands in the Indian Ocean
 List of islands in the Pacific Ocean

References

Further reading

External links
 
 
 
 
 
 

Indian Ocean
Pacific Ocean
Free trade agreements of Japan
Free trade agreements of the United States